Quirihue is a Chilean city in Quirihue, Itata Province, Ñuble Region.
It is located about 72 kilometers northwest of Chillán and 410 km southwest of Santiago.

Demographics
Of these, 7,952 (69.6%) lived in urban areas and 3,477 (30.4%) in rural areas. The population grew by 4.2% (458 persons) between the 1992 and 2002 censuses.

Mass Media
 "TV Quirihue Online" Channel

Administration
As a commune, Quirihue is a third-level administrative division of Chile administered by a municipal council, headed by an alcalde who is directly elected every four years. The 2008-2012 alcalde was Tomás Irribarra De La Torre (PRSD).

Within the electoral divisions of Chile, Quirihue is represented in the Chamber of Deputies by Jorge Sabag (PDC) and Frank Sauerbaum (RN) as part of the 42nd electoral district, together with San Fabián, Ñiquén, San Carlos, San Nicolás, Ninhue, Cobquecura, Treguaco, Portezuelo, Coelemu, Ránquil, Quillón, Bulnes, Cabrero and Yumbel. The commune is represented in the Senate by Alejandro Navarro Brain (MAS) and Hosain Sabag Castillo (PDC) as part of the 12th senatorial constituency (Biobío-Cordillera).

References

External links

  Municipality of Quirihue
A Web Portal about Quirihue
Streets of Quirihue
Last Quirihue's News (in Spanish)
A blog about Quirihue
Turistel Maps
More Photos of Quirihue
Quirihue Island - Antarctica
Tv Quirihue Online

Communes of Chile
Populated places established in 1749
Populated places in Itata Province
1749 establishments in the Spanish Empire